Michael Young (better known as Mike Yung) is an American singer from New York City. He competed on America's Got Talent season 12 and made it to the semifinals. He released his debut album, I Will Never Give Up, in 2018.

Career

Before America's Got Talent
Mike Yung sang at New York City Subway stations before his career on America's Got Talent. In 2016, a video of him in a subway station singing The Righteous Brothers' "Unchained Melody" went viral. The video was viewed over 2 million times in one week. He performed the song on The Late Late Show with James Corden to promote it as the lead single of his album.

America's Got Talent

Yung passed the audition for America's Got Talent and made it to the quarterfinals. He performed "Thinking Out Loud" by Ed Sheeran in the quarterfinals. Yung was eliminated in the semifinals where he performed " Don't Give Up on Me" by Solomon Burke.

After America's Got Talent
Yung released "Alright" as a single on January 12, 2018, along with a lyric video. On March 2, 2018, Yung announced a Kickstarter fundraiser for the album, where he had raised $90,000, enough for an EP,  .

On July 28, 2018, Yung started his Never Give Up Tour.

In August 2018, Dutch DJ/producer Martin Garrix confirmed in an interview to be working with Yung on a new song which will be released on November 1, 2018 titled "Dreamer". The song was released on that day and made a tribute to Mike's late wife Lydia, who had died earlier that year.

Discography

Singles

References 

American singer-songwriters
1959 births
Living people
America's Got Talent contestants